Lycaena sichuanica is a butterfly of the family Lycaenidae. It is found in Sichuan in China. The species was described in 2001 and in 2009 the first female specimens were found.

The forewings have an orange ground colour with a broad border and a row of black dots along the outer edge of the orange. The underside is grey. The hindwings are blackish brown on the upperside and grey with black dots on the underside.

There are possibly multiple generations per year.

The larvae feed on Rumex species, although first instars also accept Persicaria bistorta. They are green.

References
 &  (2011) "First report of early stages and ecological data of Lycaena sichuanica in Sichuan, China (Lepidoptera: Lycaenidae)" Entomologische Berichten Vol. 71 No. 3 pp. 77–80.

Butterflies described in 2001
Lycaena